Acrocercops terminaliae is a moth of the family Gracillariidae. It is known from India (West Bengal).

The larvae feed on Terminalia catappa and Terminalia myriocarpa. They probably mine the leaves of their host plant.

References

terminaliae
Moths described in 1862
Moths of Asia